The Hsinchu Biomedical Science Park (HBSP) is an industrial park in Zhubei City, Hsinchu County, Taiwan which is part of the Hsinchu Science Park.

History
The project for the establishment of the science park was approved by the Executive Yuan on 28 March 2003, followed by the budgeting process, land acquisition, park planning and construction of the public facilities and biotechnology plant. It was opened on 16 December 2014.

Architecture
The industrial park spans over an area of 38.1 hectares.

Transportation
The industrial park is accessible within walking distance east of Hsinchu Station of Taiwan High Speed Rail.

Tenants
 National Laboratory Animal Center

References

2014 establishments in Taiwan
Buildings and structures completed in 2014
Buildings and structures in Hsinchu County
Science parks in Taiwan